Presidio Go Shuttle (formerly PresidiGo) is a public transit system in San Francisco, California serving the San Francisco Presidio. The service includes two routes: the "South Hills" route providing circulator service within the Presidio, and the "Downtown" route connecting to Embarcadero station and the Transbay Transit Center in downtown San Francisco. (A second circulator route, the "Crissy Field" route, was discontinued in 2020 due to low ridership.) The routes connect at the Presidio Transit Center, which is also served by Muni bus route . The service is nominally free public transport, although a rider pass or Muni Visitor Passport is required for some trips during rush hours. Operations are contracted to MV Transportation and are overseen by the Presidio Trust.

The service uses nine buses: three cutaway buses for the circulator route, and six larger buses (five ElDorado National XHF and one New Flyer XN40) for the downtown route. The buses use compressed natural gas (CNG) fuel and are stored in a facility at Fort Scott. , the Presidio Trust plans to order 2 BYD battery electric buses to replace the current CNG cutaway buses used on the circulator route. The buses are expected to enter service in September 2021.

References

External links

PresidiGo Shuttle

Bus companies of the United States
Public transportation in California
Transportation companies based in California